Sickle (8 February 1924 – 26 December 1943) was a British-bred thoroughbred racehorse who was later exported to the US where he was twice the leading sire in North America. He was bred by Edward Stanley, 17th Earl of Derby.

Sickle was a full brother to Pharamond, who also was a successful sire in the US Their sire Phalaris, was twice the leading sire in Great Britain and Ireland and a three-time leading broodmare sire in Great Britain & Ireland. His dam Selene produced 16 named foals including the leading Argentine and Brazilian sire Hunter's Moon, and Hyperion, the 1933 Epsom Derby and St Leger Stakes winner and a six-time leading sire in Great Britain and Ireland as well as a four-time leading broodmare sire in Great Britain and Ireland. Pharamond and Sickle were inbred to Cyllene in the third and fourth generation (3Sx4D) and St. Simon in the third and fourth generation (4Sx3D).

Sickle was raced by Lord Derby and trained by George Lambton. The colt met with some success in racing, winning three of his ten starts and notably finishing third in a field of 23 in the 2,000 Guineas Stakes in 1927.

Stud record
Retired to Lord Derby's stud for the 1929 breeding season, in a three-year lease agreement with American Joseph E. Widener that included a US$100,000 option to purchase, Sickle was sent to the US in time for the 1930 breeding season at Widener's Elmendorf Farm. In England, Sickle's first crop produced three stakes winners and in 1932 Widener exercised his option and purchased the horse. His first offspring in the US also met with racing success and Sickle went on to become a two-time leading sire in the US during his stud career, in 1936 and again in 1938. He was the sire of 297 foals, including 45 stakes winners.
His progeny includes:

Sickle's bloodline legacy came through his son Unbreakable who sired the 1945 Preakness Stakes winner and the 1947 American Champion Sprint Horse, Polynesian. Polynesian in turn sired the US Racing Hall of Fame inductee Native Dancer who was rated No.7 in the Blood-Horse Magazine List of the Top 100 US Racehorses of the 20th Century. Native Dancer sired Raise A Native, and was the damsire of Northern Dancer. Polynesian also sired the 1956 American Champion Two-Year-Old Colt, Barbizon, plus Imbros, a multiple stakes winner who set or equalled five track records including a world record for 7 furlongs, and the very good runner and important broodmare, Alanesian. Because of Polynesian, Sickle's sireline includes Sea Bird, the 1965 Epsom Derby and Prix de l'Arc de Triomphe winner whose Timeform rating is the second highest ever awarded in flat racing, and the very influential Mr. Prospector, a two-time leading sire in North America and nine-time leading broodmare sire in North America.

Sickle was the damsire of Kersala, the 1958 Kentucky Broodmare of the Year, as well as the damsire of these four Champions:

At age nineteen, Sickle died unexpectedly on 26 December 1943 and was buried in the Elmendorf equine cemetery on acreage that was later subdivided and is now known as Normandy Farm.

Pedigree

References

1924 racehorse births
1943 racehorse deaths
Racehorses bred in the United Kingdom
Racehorses trained in the United Kingdom
United States Champion Thoroughbred Sires
Thoroughbred family 6-e